Breed 77 is the debut studio album by Gibraltarian flamenco metal band Breed 77. It was originally released in 2000 and re-released in 2005 due to popular demand.  The album was also released as a limited edition in a crucifix-style fold-out digipak. In 2005 "Shadows" from this album was released as a single.

All tracks in this album written by Breed 77 and produced, mixed and engineered by Paul Hoare.

Track listing
"Shadows" – 3:09
"Rise" – 4:12
"Switch" – 3:38
"Breaking The Silence" – 5:09
"Karma" – 4:56
"Floods" – 5:51
"Final Prayer" – 5:59
"A Safe Place" – 3:49
"Fly" – 5:09
"Eyes That See" – 4:26
"Know That You Know" – 4:00
"The Hole" – 3:23

References

Breed 77 albums
2000 debut albums